The Partially Examined Life is a podcast and downloadable audio series about philosophy. It is self described at the beginning of many episodes as "A philosophy podcast by some guys who were at one point set on doing philosophy for a living, but then thought better of it." The most frequent participants are Mark Linsenmayer, Seth Paskin, Wes Alwan, and Dylan Casey. The show also sometimes brings on experts to discuss particular topics. The podcast's website also hosts other podcasts: music-based Nakedly Examined Music, Phi Fic: Truth in Fiction, Combat & Classics and Constellary Tales.

History 

The show came together as the brain child of Mark Linsenmayer who reached out to Seth Paskin and Wes Alwan to do the show in the format of a podcast.  Mark, Seth, and Wes had been classmates at the University of Texas while earning their master's degrees in Philosophy.  The first full episode, "The Unexamined Life Is Not Worth Living," aired (became downloadable) on May 12, 2009.  Dylan Casey later joined the program as a regular after previously having been a frequent guest. Dylan also manages The Partially Examined Life website.

Awards

References to The Partially Examined Life 

 The A.V. Club discussed The Partially Examined Life in their publication for the week of February 23–29.
 The National Catholic Reporter mentioned The Partially Examined Life in a blog post on Kierkegaard on February 27, 2012.
 Bad Philosophy Podcast episode 116 mentions The Partially Examined Life.
 Artist Dennis Hollingsworth mentioned The Partially Examined Life in a post on his website, referring to Episode six on Leibniz.
 Well-known American art critic and philosopher Arthur Danto, whose essays  "The Appreciation and Interpretation of Works of Art," and "The End of Art" were the subject of Episode 16 "Danto on Art," listened to and enjoyed the program.  He later wrote to the show and suggested follow up readings.
The Partially Examined Life was reviewed by Colin Marshall of Maximum Fun on January 2, 2012.
 Patricia Churchland, well known Canadian-American philosopher and author, appeared on the podcast to discuss her work "Braintrust: What neuroscience tells us about Morality" in Episode 41.
 Slate'''s Stephen Metcalf talks up The Partially Examined Life on the Culture Gabfest.

List of episodes
The following is an incomplete list of official episodes of The Partially Examined Life''.  The podcasters have also released music, pre-episodes ("Precognitions"), and other non "official episode" media.  This list includes only the official, numbered episodes of the podcast.

References

Philosophy podcasts
Audio podcasts
2009 podcast debuts